Simon Silwimba (born 25 December 1991) is a Zambian footballer who plays as a defender for ZESCO United F.C. and the Zambia national football team.

Career

International
Silwimba made his senior international debut on 31 December 2010 in a 4-0 friendly defeat to Kuwait. He scored his first international goal in 2017, finding the net in a 3-0 victory over Eswatini during African Nations Championship qualifying.

Career statistics

International

International Goals
Scores and results list Zambia's goal tally first.

References

External links

1991 births
Living people
Zambian footballers
Zambia international footballers
Association football defenders
Zambia A' international footballers
2018 African Nations Championship players
Zanaco F.C. players
ZESCO United F.C. players